Events from the year 1903 in Italy.

Kingdom of Italy
Monarch – Victor Emmanuel III (1900–1946)
Prime Minister –
 Giuseppe Zanardelli (1901–1903)
 Giovanni Giolitti (1903–1905)
Population – 33,004,000

Events
The year is marked by the return of Giovanni Giolitti as Prime Minister. He will dominate Italian politics until World War I, a period known as the Giolittian Era in which Italy experienced an industrial expansion, the rise of organised labour and the emergence of an active Catholic political movement.

February
 February 13 – Venezuelan crisis. After agreeing to arbitration in Washington, Britain, Germany and Italy reach a settlement with Venezuela, resulting in the Washington Protocols. The naval blockade that began in December 1902 will be  lifted, and Venezuela commit 30% of its customs duties to settling claims.

June
 June 13 – Prime Minister Giuseppe Zanardelli resigns after losing a vote in the Italian Chamber of Deputies. However, after several attempts the Cabinet is reconstructed. The Interior Minister Giovanni Giolitti is replaced.

July
 July 31 – Start of the Papal conclave after the death of the 93-year-old Pope Leo XIII. Giuseppe Melchiorre Sarto was elected on August 4 as Pope Pius X. Pius X's papacy would feature vigorous condemnation of what he termed 'modernists' and 'relativists' whom he regarded as dangers to the Catholic faith (see for example his Oath Against Modernism).

October
 October 21 – Due to ill health Prime Minister Giuseppe Zanardelli resigns.

November
 November 3 – Giovanni Giolitti forms a new Cabinet.

Births
January 9 – Gioacchino Colombo, Italian automobile engine designer for Alfa Romeo and Ferrari (d. 1988)
 February 16 – Beniamino Segre, Italian mathematician (d. 1977)
 February 26 – Giulio Natta, Italian chemist, Nobel Prize laureate (d. 1979)
 March 18 – Galeazzo Ciano, Italian diplomat and Foreign Minister of Fascist Italy 1936–1943 (d. 1944)
 July 16 – Adalberto Libera, Italian Modernist architect (d. 1963)
 September 13, Leopoldo Rubinacci, Italian politician, lawyer and trade unionist (d. 1969)

Deaths
 July 20 – Pope Leo XIII, Italian Roman Catholic Pope (b. 1810)
 December 26 – Giuseppe Zanardelli, Italian politician and Prime Minister (b. 1826)

References

 Sarti, Roland (2004). Italy: a reference guide from the Renaissance to the present, New York: Facts on File Inc., 

 
Italy
Years of the 20th century in Italy